Chionodes sepultor is a moth in the family Gelechiidae. It is found in North America, where it has been recorded from Wyoming, Utah, Nebraska, South Dakota, Colorado, Washington, Montana and Oregon.

References

Chionodes
Moths described in 1999
Moths of North America